"Qualcosa che non c'è" is the fourth single from the Greatest Hits by the Italian singer Elisa, Soundtrack '96-'06.

It is an introspective, intimate, and deeply autobiographical song. The promo aired on the radio from 2 November 2007, exclusively in Italy.

It advises "Fare tutto come se vedessi solo il sole, e non qualcosa che non c'è" ("Do everything as if you only saw the sun, and not something that doesn't exist").

Chart performance

References

2007 singles
Elisa (Italian singer) songs
Italian-language songs
Songs written by Elisa (Italian singer)
2006 songs
Sugar Music singles